The Highland Railway Ben Class were small 4-4-0 passenger steam locomotives.  There were actually two separate 'Ben' classes, usually referred to as the 'Small Bens' and the 'Large Bens'.

Introduction

Despite the large and small tags, there was actually little difference between the two groups, the most crucial being larger boilers with an increase in tube heating surface. Cylinder and wheel dimensions were identical.

The class was originally designed by Peter Drummond, whose elder (and better known) brother Dugald had been in the company's locomotive department in earlier years and was at that time Chief Mechanical Engineer of the London and South Western Railway.

In appearance they were fairly typical Drummond family products with the stiffener across the cab roof. They were also inside cylindered, almost uniquely among HR bogie locomotives.

Build details

First batch

The first 8 locomotives were of the Small Ben type and were built by Dübs and Company of Glasgow in the period 1898 to 1899. They were:

No. 1 was originally named Ben Nevis for its works portrait, an action that attracted the ire of the board as it was in the territory of a competitor (the North British Railway). It was renamed before entering service.

Second batch

The Highland Railway built another nine during 1899–1900 at their own Lochgorm works:

Third batch

Finally, three more were built by the North British Locomotive Company of Glasgow in 1906.

Large Bens

In 1908 a larger version appeared, initially four examples from North British Locomotive, with two more the following year

Grouping and Nationalisation

All of these locomotives survived to be taken over by the LMS at the Grouping in 1923. The Large Bens were all withdrawn between 1932 and 1937. The first of the Small Bens was withdrawn in 1931, but ten survived into British Railways ownership. The last of these, 54398 Ben Alder, was withdrawn in 1953 and placed in storage in the hope that it would be preserved.

Preservation attempts and revival
Unfortunately the hopes for 54398 – which included the intention to restore the locomotive to Highland Railway condition – came to nothing, and following storage at various locations (including Boat of Garten) it was eventually cut up on 05/1966; and so, none were preserved. However, a charitable organisation has been formed with the aim of building a working replica of 54398 Ben Alder.

References

External links
Rail UK database no. 54398

Ben Class
4-4-0 locomotives
Dübs locomotives
NBL locomotives
Railway locomotives introduced in 1898
Scrapped locomotives
Standard gauge steam locomotives of Great Britain